Sant Tukaram Nagar is located in the suburbs of Pune, India.

Sant Tukaram Nagar and Vallabh Nagar are close to each other. Sant Tukaram Nagar is famous for D. Y. Patil College- Dr. D. Y. Patil Vidyapeeth, Pune

and Yashwantrao Chavan Municipal Hospital (YCM).

Sant Tukaram Nagar comes under Pimpri-Chinchwad Municipal Corporation but has its own fire department, police station and waste disposal services. Because of the colleges many students live here as paying guests, which is a significant source of income for the locals.
By blessings of all mighty and his grace Langar was organised here.

References

Neighbourhoods in Pimpri-Chinchwad